Pilgrim is an unincorporated community located in Martin County, Kentucky, United States.

References

Unincorporated communities in Martin County, Kentucky
Unincorporated communities in Kentucky